USS Express No. 4 (SP-745), sometimes written as Express # 4, was a United States Navy patrol vessel in commission from 1917 to 1919.

Express No. 4 was built as a private motorboat of the same name in 1917 by C. F. Ferguson at Groton, Connecticut. Upon her completion in early July 1917, the U.S. Navy leased her from her owner, M. F. Plant of Groton, for use as a section patrol boat during World War I. She was enrolled in the Naval Coast Defense Reserve and was commissioned on 2 July 1917 as USS Express No. 4 (SP-745).

Although assigned to the 2nd Naval District in southern New England, Express No. 4 operated on patrol duties along the United States East Coast as far south as Florida during World War I.

Decommissioned after the end of the war, Express No. 4 was stricken from the Navy List on 23 January 1919 and returned to Plant.

References

Department of the Navy Naval History and Heritage Command Online Library of Selected Images:Civilian Ships: Express # 4 (American Motor Boat, 1917). Served as USS Express # 4 (SP-745) in 1917-1919
NavSource Online: Section Patrol Craft Photo Archive Express No. 4 (SP 745)

Patrol vessels of the United States Navy
World War I patrol vessels of the United States
Ships built in Groton, Connecticut
1917 ships